Paris is a 1929 American Pre-Code musical comedy film, featuring Irène Bordoni. It was filmed with Technicolor sequences: four of the film's ten reels were originally photographed in Technicolor.

Paris was the fourth color film released by Warner Bros.; the first three were The Desert Song  (although it was only a part-color film), On with the Show, and Gold Diggers of Broadway, all released in 1929. (Song of the West was actually completed by June 1929 but had its release delayed until March 1930). The film was adapted from the Cole Porter Broadway musical of the same name. The musical was Porter's first Broadway hit. Only fragment film elements of Paris are known to exist, although the complete soundtrack survives on Vitaphone disks. The sound tape reels for this film survives at UCLA Film and Television Archive.

Paris was the fourth film Warner Brothers had made with their Technicolor contract. The filmmakers used a color (Technicolor) process of red and green, at the time it was the third process of Technicolor.

Plot
Irène Bordoni is cast as Vivienne Rolland, a Parisian chorus girl in love with Massachusetts boy Andrew Sabbot (Jason Robards Sr.) Andrew's snobbish mother Cora (Louise Closser Hale) tries to break up the romance. Jack Buchanan likewise makes his talking-picture debut as Guy Pennell, the leading man in Vivienne's revue.

Cast
 Irène Bordoni as Vivienne Rolland
 Jack Buchanan as Guy Pennell
 Louise Closser Hale as Cora Sabbot
 Jason Robards as Andrew Sabbot
 ZaSu Pitts as Harriet
 Margaret Fielding as Brenda Kaley

Production
Warner Bros. paid the celebrated French music hall star and Broadway chanteuse Irene Bordoni $10,000 a week to star in this film, playing the role she had originated on Broadway, introducing the enduring Porter standard "Let's Do It, Let's Fall in Love". While this film was being shot, the studio was in the process of completing their all-star revue The Show of Shows (1929), so they had Bordoni film a number for the revue. Their initial intention was to have Bordoni star in two musical features, but due to the poor box-office reception of Paris, they decided not to make any more films with her.

Songs

Advertisement
Paris used advertisements of a type which were common for its time, featuring the talking in the film and Irène Bordoni starring. One ad for Paris said "See the talking picture of the future".

Preservation
One of the color reels from Paris exists at the British Film Institute (BFI) archive. The complete soundtrack also survives on Vitaphone disks. The sound tape reels for this film survives at UCLA Film and Television Archive. According to the George Eastman Museum 2015 book The Dawn of Technicolor, 1915-1935, there are three fragments at the Seaver Center. In 2018 BFI discovered a one minute Technicolor fragment being used as a film leader, along with fragments of various other films, which are included in video posted to YouTube on April 27, 2018.

In the surviving fragments, actress May Robson is revealed at a dinner table, as Irene Bordoni finishes up a singing performance. Possibly she was replacing the credited Louise Closser Hale and was a last minute cast change. Last minute cast changes abound in silent films and early talkies. Sometimes promotional material for a film was already printed up before a release and studios did not want to expend the money to reprint promotional artwork for one cast member change.

Box office
According to Warner Bros records the film earned $632,000 domestically and $541,000 in other markets.

See also
 List of early color feature films
 List of incomplete or partially lost films

References

External links

 
 
 

1929 films
1920s color films
1929 lost films
1920s English-language films
Films directed by Clarence G. Badger
Lost American films
Warner Bros. films
1929 musical comedy films
First National Pictures films
Films produced by Robert North
American musical comedy films
Lost musical comedy films
Films based on musicals
Films scored by Cole Porter
Films scored by Edward Ward (composer)
1920s American films